Stanley John Hovdebo (20 July 1925 – 14 January 2018) was a New Democratic Party member of the House of Commons of Canada. He was an educator by career.

He first campaigned in the Saskatchewan riding of Prince Albert during the 1979 federal election, where he lost to former Prime Minister John Diefenbaker, the longtime Progressive Conservative Member of Parliament. Diefenbaker died in office that 16 August, however, triggering a by-election on 19 November 1979. Hovdebo ran again for the NDP and this time became the MP for Prince Albert.

Hovdebo won re-election at Prince Albert in the 1980 and 1984 federal elections. Prince Albert was abolished ahead of 1988 federal election. Hovdebo transferred to Saskatoon—Humboldt riding and returned to Parliament for a third full term before retiring in 1993.

Hovdebo served in the last weeks of the 31st Canadian Parliament and for full terms in the 32nd, 33rd, and 34th Canadian Parliaments. He died in 2018 at the age of 92.

Electoral record

References

1925 births
2018 deaths
Members of the House of Commons of Canada from Saskatchewan
New Democratic Party MPs
Politicians from Prince Albert, Saskatchewan
Canadian people of Norwegian descent
20th-century Canadian politicians